Glacier Country, Montana is a tourism region in the U.S. state of Montana. Glacier Country includes the cities of Missoula, Kalispell, Polson, Libby, Whitefish, Browning, Eureka, and Thompson Falls. Glacier Country is home to Glacier National Park, and Montana's 2nd largest city- Missoula, Montana. The 2015 population of Glacier Country is 332,702.

Regions

Glacier County 
Glacier County is located in the U.S. state of Montana. As of the 2010 census, the population was 13,399.[1] The county is located in northwestern Montana between the Great Plains and the Rocky Mountains, known to the Blackfeet as the "Backbone of the World." The county is geographically and culturally diverse and includes the Blackfeet American Indian Reservation, Glacier National Park, and Lewis and Clark National Forest. The county is bordered by 75 miles of international boundary with two ports of entry (Piegan and Del Bonita) open year-round and one seasonal (Chief Mountain) international border crossing into Alberta, Canada.

Ravalli County 
Ravalli County is located in the southwestern part of the U.S. state of Montana. As of the 2010 census, the population was 40,212.[1] Its county seat is Hamilton.[2] Ravalli County is part of a north/south mountain valley bordered by the Sapphire Mountains on the East and the Bitterroot Mountains on the West. It is often referred to as the Bitterroot Valley, named for the Bitterroot Flower. The county is entirely on the Pacific Ocean side of the Continental Divide, which follows the Idaho-Montana border from Wyoming until Ravalli County. Here it turns east into Montana, between Chief Joseph Pass and Lost Trail Pass, and follows the Ravalli County-Beaverhead County border.

Flathead & Lake Counties 
Flathead and Lake counties are usually the main recreation areas for Glacier Country, and are home to Glacier National Park. The main commercial centers for this region are Kalispell and Whitefish. Kalispell is the commercial core for Northwest Montana, and has a population of around 25,000 people, making it the second largest city in Glacier Country, Montana. Whitefish is the 3rd largest city in northwest Montana, and has doubled its population in the past 10 years. It is served Glacier Park International Airport.

Missoula  
Missoula is the largest city in all of Western Montana, and the second largest in Montana. As of 2009 the city of Missoula had surpassed 65,000 people, and its county had well surpassed 100,000 people at around 108,623. It is the core commercial and shopping hub in all of Western Montana, and 2nd in Montana, and is also considered the cultural hub of Montana. Missoula is home to Montana's largest on-campus state University—the University of Montana, which in 2010 had over 15,000 students. Missoula is also the largest Media market in the state. Some local news sources include the Missoulian and the Missoula Independent. Missoula is also served by the Missoula International Airport. Missoula has a semi-pro baseball team, the Missoula Osprey. Downtown Missoula is a thriving area, and is known as the main shopping district of Montana. Missoula's nickname is the Garden City for its dense trees and green landscape, and because Missoula winters are slightly more mild than in the rest of the state.

Lincoln, Sanders, Mineral 
Lincoln, Sanders and Mineral counties are probably the “quietest” out of all the regions, with small communities and towns. Libby, Montana is the county seat of Lincoln County. Libby has a population of 2,626 people and is home to Marc Racicot. Thompson Falls, Montana is the county seat of Sanders County. Thompson Falls population is 1,321 and is home to Thompson Falls High School. Superior, Montana is the county seat of Mineral County and has a population of 893 people.

Largest Cities

See also 
List of counties in Montana
Glacier County, Montana

References 

Regions of Montana